Niels Hemmingsens Gade is a street in the Old Town of Copenhagen, Denmark. It runs from the western part of Amagertorv in the south to Skindergade in the north and passes Gråbrødretorv on the way. The Church of the Holy Ghost is located in the street. The street is named after the 16th-century Lutheran theologian Niels Hemmingsen.

History

The street has existed since the Middle Ages but was formerly known under different names. It was a very narrow alley.

It was a narrow, vaulted passageway which ran through a building. The building had six window bays along the square and two window bays across the street.

 
 was merged into  in 1843 after complaints from the residents who found the name unappealing.  was renamed . In 1881, the entire street was renamed  to commemorate the theologian Niels Hemmingsen.

The churchyard was originally surrounded by a low wall. It was demolished and replaced by an iron fence in 1797.

Notable buildings

The House of the Holy Ghost is now used as an exhibition space.

The Women's Building at No. 8–10 was built in 1935 in a Functionalist style by Ragna Grubb. The music venue Jazzhouse is located in the building.

No. 1, 3, 15, 23 and 32 all date from the 18th century and are listed.

No. 24 ( 24/ 7) is a former hospitality school.  The building was designed by Vilhelm Klein and H. C. Stilling. The school has now moved to Vigerslev Allé in Valby.

Ingemann also designed the building at No. 32–34. It is now known as Pressens Hus.

Public art and memorials

It mentions that they founded Herlufsholm School on 23 May 1565 and that Trolle died one month later in the house at the site.

The Keystone above the gate to No. 32 features the names Christopher Klog and Anna Jensdatter, Below the stone is a gilded Neptune figure. Klog (1696–1750), a merchant and brewer, was also director of Kjøbenhavns Brandforsikring.

References

External links

 Niels Hemmingsens Gade at indenforvoldene.dk
 Source

Streets in Copenhagen